Nina Cecelia Francesca Gorst ( – ) was a British novelist. 

Her brother was the dramatist Charles Rann Kennedy. She married the journalist and playwright Harold Edward Gorst. 

Most of her novels were dramatizations of the lives of poor Londoners focusing on female characters.  The Light (1906), which was described as a "Cockney Aurora Leigh," features an orphan girl who gives birth to a blind child.  The book follows her spiritual growth as she moves from the workhouse to a series of menial jobs.

Gorst had some spiritualist inclinations.  She constantly wore a chain with 19 charms she called talismans.  Winifred Graham wrote that Gorst was "the most famous palmist in London".

Nina Gorst died on 19 October 1926 in London.

Bibliography 

 Possessed of Devils.  1 vol.  London: John Macqueen, 1897.
 --and Afterwards?.  1 vol.  London: Greening and Co., 1901.
 This Our Sister, 1905
 The Light, 1906
 Soul of Milly Green, 1907
 Thief on the Cross, 1908
 The Leech, 1911
 The Night is Far Spent, 1919 (autobiography) 
 The Misbegotten, 1921

References 

Created via preloaddraft
1869 births
1926 deaths
British women novelists